WRHO (89.7 FM) is a radio station broadcasting an album-oriented rock format. Licensed to Oneonta, New York, United States.  The station is currently owned by Hartwick College.

WRHO is a small, noncommercial educational broadcast facility on the Hartwick College campus in Oneonta, NY. At 270 watts, WRHO broadcasts 24 hours per day, 365 days a year at 89.7 FM. The studios are located inside the Dewar Union Hall Communication Suite on Hartwick's campus and broadcasts to a listening audience within a ~30mile radius via a 500-watt transmitter.

WRHO has been on the air for over four decades, playing music not otherwise heard on other area stations. WRHO also connects with the Oneonta community at large by stating public service announcements of upcoming events, by hosting bands, and by offering services to other clubs and organizations on campus. Every year during Spring Weekend WRHO broadcasts live for 72 hours from a tent on Frisbee Field on the Hartwick campus.

On WRHO, all types of music can be found. Jazz to Heavy Metal, Folk and Country to Reggae, Classic Rock and Oldies to Hip Hop. WRHO receives numerous demo tapes and pre-releases from both big-time national groups and local bands before any commercial stations, which are played often.

References

External links

2BS Radio Archive
 Bill Ketelhut (aka Wild Bill) (On-air talent 1987-1991)

RHO
Radio stations established in 1978